The 2017–18 season was Sport Lisboa e Benfica's 114th season in existence and the club's 84th consecutive season in the top flight of Portuguese football. It started on 5 August 2017 with Benfica's victory in the Supertaça Cândido de Oliveira and concluded on 13 May 2018.

Benfica played in the Primeira Liga as four-time defending champions for the first time in their history and finished second. Benfica also entered the Taça de Portugal as title holders but were eliminated in the fifth round. Moreover, they were eliminated in the third round of the Taça da Liga.

Internationally, Benfica competed in the UEFA Champions League for the eight time in a row but failed to gain a single point in the group stage for their first time, finishing with a negative goal difference of 13, which became the worst campaign of a Portuguese team in that competition.

Season overview
On 29 June 2017, club president Luís Filipe Vieira gave the motto for the coming season, "Rumo ao Penta", and promised a renewed ambition to conquer an unprecedented fifth-straight Primeira Liga title for Benfica. The following day, manager Rui Vitória explained his approach to the new season: "We know that there's a goal previously assumed by the President and the best way to achieve it is to go on together, like it was the first time. It is fundamental to have the first time ambition. Humble and focused so that it can happen." Despite the ambition, on 31 July, Vieira said that "one can mortgage a title or another but not the future [of the club]", referring to player transfers.

Transfers

Haris Seferovic, Filip Krovinović, Martin Chrien and Bruno Varela transferred to Benfica. Diogo Gonçalves and Rúben Dias were promoted from Benfica B and João Carvalho integrated the team after a loan spell at Vitória de Setúbal.

Benfica lost three players from the starting 11 before the season started: on 1 June, Ederson signed with Manchester City for €40 million; on 14 June, Victor Lindelöf left to Manchester United for €35 million; and on 14 July, Nélson Semedo moved to Barcelona for €30.5 million. On 31 July, referring to the club's sales, Vieira said, "Until we do not have control over the debt, we will not stop selling."

Later in August, Benfica loaned out André Carrillo to Watford and André Horta to Braga, while Mile Svilar joined from Anderlecht. On transfer deadline day, Benfica announced the signings of Douglas and Gabriel Barbosa, both on a one-year loan spell from their respective clubs. The same day, Kostas Mitroglou, Benfica's top goalscorer in the previous season, was transferred to Olympique de Marseille for €15 million.

During the mid-season transfer window, Lisandro López signed with Inter Milan on a half-year loan deal with an option to make the switch permanent. On 25 January, Filipe Augusto was loaned out to Alanyaspor for one-and-a-half years and Barbosa's contract was terminated.

Pre-season
The pre-season started on 30 June 2017 with the usual medical exams and physical tests at Caixa Futebol Campus and at Hospital da Luz. Until 12 July, the work schedule took place on the club's training ground. As for the team's commitments, the program included the Uhrencup in Switzerland, a five-day stay in Algarve with two matches, and a stage at St George's Park in England, from 23 to 28 July, before the Emirates Cup. Benfica finished third in the Swiss tournament after a 5–1 defeat to Young Boys. The team redeemed itself with a victory in the Algarve Football Cup thanks to a brace by newly signed Seferovic. On 26 July, Benfica played a behind-closed-doors friendly against Swindon Town at Futebol Campus, where Seferovic and Andrija Živković scored for Benfica in a 2–1 win. Once again, Benfica stood powerless in the Emirates Cup. By losing both matches, the team repeated its fourth-place finish achieved in 2014. Due to Chapecoense's cancellation, Benfica did not host the Eusébio Cup in the pre-season for the first time since its first edition in 2008.

As with the previous season, Benfica kept struggling with player injuries. On 17 June, Álex Grimaldo did not take part in Spain's squad for the UEFA European Under-21 Championship due to a "little injury" resulting in him missing the start of Benfica's pre-season. Nine days after signing with Benfica, Krovinović underwent surgery on 23 June to correct a left inguinal hernia. He was one of three players absent from the squad who travelled to Switzerland, along with Luisão (right knee injury) and Eduardo Salvio (right tibiotarsal sprain). André Almeida suffered a contusion on his right thigh, which prevented him from travelling to Algarve.

Supertaça Cândido de Oliveira
For the opening match of the regular season, Benfica had five players on the injury list: Júlio César, Živković, Carrillo, Horta and Mitroglou. Andreas Samaris was also not an option because he was serving the first of a four-match suspension for having punched Diego Ivo on 9 April. Benfica defeated Vitória de Guimarães 3–1 with goals from Jonas, Seferovic and Raúl Jiménez. Raphinha scored for Vitória. It was the first time Benfica managed to win back-to-back Super Cup trophies. Seferovic made his official debut for Benfica and Varela, a former Benfica B player, debuted for the first team after being called-up to the substitutes' bench nine times since 2011. Grimaldo suffered a muscular injury on his right leg and was substituted for Eliseu in the 75th minute.

Primeira Liga
With three consecutive victories, Benfica achieved their best start in the Primeira Liga since the 2004–05 season. By scoring a goal in each of those matches, Seferovic managed to score in his first four official appearances for Benfica, repeating the feat of Mário Coluna and Nolito (all behind Eusébio). A 1–1 draw at Rio Ave, in a match where Jardel was substituted due to injury on his right tight, left Benfica in third place of the league by the end of August. After losing 2–1 at Boavista and drawing 1–1 with Marítimo at the Estádio dos Barreiros, Benfica were 5 points behind leaders Porto before October's international break.

Benfica won their next three matches but maintained the point difference to the top of the table. By scoring, at least, one goal per match between Match 3 and Match 11, Jonas became the third Benfica player to score in nine consecutive Primeira Liga matches after Julinho (1949–50) and Eusébio (1964–65). He improved his mark by scoring in the following match. Benfica ended 2017 with 36 points, 3 less than their two rivals.

2018 started with the Derby de Lisboa at home, which ended in a 1–1 draw. Midway through January, in a match against Chaves, Krovinović suffered a season-ending injury to his right knee. The results of round 21 lifted Benfica into second place, thus surpassing Sporting CP on the account of the goal difference criteria. Despite the ascendant in the league table, Benfica still could not avoid player injuries; Salvio suffered another right knee injury and was submitted to an arthroscopy.

After a 5–0 home win on 3 March, Benfica achieved five consecutive victories for the first time during the season. On 10 March, Benfica assured a place in Europa League's qualifying rounds. On round 28, Benfica regained the first place, with a one-point lead over Porto. The nine-match win streak came to an end after a 1–0 home defeat in O Clássico, a result that also culminated in a return to the second place. It was the fourth match in a row Benfica could not beat Porto at the Estádio da Luz (two draws and two defeats), a negative record achieved for the third time. With a 3–2 home loss to Tondela, Benfica suffered two consecutive league defeats at Estádio da Luz for the first time since the 2008–09 season.

With a 1–0 home win against Moreirense on the last matchday, Benfica attained 80+ points in the Primeira Liga for the fourth consecutive season. Due to the defeat of Sporting CP at Funchal, Benfica's result allowed the club to secure the second place and the qualification for the 2018–19 UEFA Champions League third qualifying round.

UEFA Champions League

Twenty five players made Benfica's list for the group stage of the UEFA Champions League. Benfica started the European campaign with a 2–1 home defeat to CSKA Moscow, in what was their first loss of the season. On 27 September, Benfica moved to the bottom of Group A after a 5–0 away loss to Basel. It was Benfica's biggest defeat in the UEFA Champions League (tied with the loss to Borussia Dortmund in the 1963–64 European Cup) and second overall in international competition.

On 18 October, Svilar became the youngest goalkeeper to play in Champions League, in a match where Benfica suffered a 1–0 home loss against Manchester United. Benfica was eliminated from European competitions after a 2–0 away loss to CSKA Moscow. By failing to score, Benfica put an end to Igor Akinfeev's streak of 43 straight UEFA Champions League group stage matches without a clean sheet. Also, with this result, Benfica lost 6 consecutive European matches for the first time in their history. This entry increased to seven consecutive losses with a 2–0 home defeat on the last matchday. Benfica became the nineteenth club, and the first seeded into Pot 1, to finish the UEFA Champions League group stage with 0 points.

Taça da Liga
Benfica started with a 1–1 home draw against Braga, in a match where Krovinović made his official debut. It was the first time since 2007 that Benfica did not win in the competition at the Estádio da Luz, ending a 20-home-game win run. After the final whistle, Samaris was involved in an altercation with Paulinho and saw a yellow card. Six days later, Samaris was punished by the Disciplinary Committee with a three-match suspension, missing Primeira Liga fixtures. Benfica continued to perform under expectations and, on 20 December, they had another home draw, despite having a 2–0 lead before the break. Two days later, they were eliminated from the competition after Vitória de Setúbal defeated Braga. With a third draw in the last match, Benfica ended their participation in the Taça da Liga without a single win for the first time.

Taça de Portugal
On 14 October, Benfica beat Olhanense 1–0 away from home in the third round of Taça de Portugal. The match was initially scheduled to be played at the Estádio José Arcanjo but was changed to the Estádio Algarve. Four players (Júlio César, Eliseu, Jardel and Jonas) missed the game due to injury, while Douglas, Carvalho and Svilar made their debut for Benfica. On 13 December, for the second time in this season, Benfica could not win at the Estádio dos Arcos. After a 2–2 draw at the end of regulation time, Hélder Guedes scored the winning goal for Rio Ave, thus eliminating the reigning title holders. Luisão got injured (right thigh muscle injury) during the second half's stoppage time, leaving Benfica to play the extra time in numerical disadvantage.

Aftermath
On 11 June, Vieira regretted the club's disappointing season overall and took responsibility for not managing to win the penta and for the negative campaign in the Champions League. Despite that, he denied disinvestment in the football team and highlighted its competitiveness. Former Benfica player and sporting director António Simões criticised the team's lack of quality and said, "With this squad and other rivals reinforcing themselves, Benfica will not win again." By failing to win the Primeira Liga and the Taça de Portugal, Benfica did not qualify for the 2018 edition of the Supertaça Cândido de Oliveira, breaking a streak of four consecutive appearances at the competition.

Five Benfica players were called by their respective national team to take part in the 2018 FIFA World Cup: Dias (Portugal), Salvio (Argentina), Živković (Serbia), Seferovic (Switzerland) and Jiménez (Mexico).

On 7 July, Benfica announced that Shéu Han, the team's technical secretary since 1989, decided to leave his post. On 31 July, Paulo Lopes announced his retirement via Instagram, making this his last season as a professional footballer. Although Luisão integrated the squad for the following season, his last professional match was on round 34 of Primeira Liga, before retiring on 25 September. Eliseu had not competed since December 2017, but in a 2019 interview he said that his career is on standby.

Club

Technical staff

{| class="wikitable"
|-
! Position
! Name
|-
| Head coach
| Rui Vitória
|-
| Assistant coach
| Sérgio BotelhoMarco PedrosoMinervino PietraArnaldo Teixeira
|-
| Rehabilitation physiotherapist
| Bruno Mendes
|-
| Goalkeeping coach
| Luís Esteves
|-
| Fitness coach
| Paulo Morão
|-
| Match observer scout
| Luís FigueiredoRenato Sousa
|-
| Physiotherapist
| Telmo FirminoPaulo Rebelo
|-
| Scout
| José Boto
|-
| Technical secretary
| Shéu
|-
| Doctor
| Bento LeitãoAntónio MartinsLluís Til
|-
| Nurse
| Duarte Pinto
|-

Other information

Players

Squad information

New contracts

Transfers

In

|-
!colspan="11"|Disclosed total
|-
!colspan="11"|€13.9M

Out

|-
!colspan="11"|Disclosed total
|-
!colspan="11"|€127.2M

Kit information

Supplier: Adidas

Sponsors: Emirates (front), Sagres (back)

Home kit: Inspired by a model used in the 1960s, this vivid red kit featured a classical design with a white polo collar and white sleeve cuffs. On the front, the manufacturer logo and the iconic sponsor phrase "Fly Emirates" were both white, as well as the beer brand logo on the back. The shirt also presented an embroidered symbol at the bottom, allusive to the 75th birthday of Eusébio. The shorts were white and the socks were in the same red shade as the shirt's. The first appearance of this kit was against Neuchâtel Xamax on 13 July.

Away kit: The alternative kit featured two tones of grey, with the body of the shirt being lighter and the sleeves and necktie (V-neck) darker. The three white Adidas' stripes were displayed vertically along the sides of the shirt. The club's badge was monochromatic and, just like in the previous seasons, it had the three stars above, each representing 10 league titles won by the club. The shorts were dark grey and the socks were predominantly light grey, with the exception of a horizontal stripe. The first appearance of this kit was against Real Betis on 20 July.

Unofficial competitions

Pre-season

On 26 April 2017, it was announced that Benfica would take part in the Emirates Cup. It was the club's second participation in the tournament, after the presence in 2014. On 17 May, the schedule for the Uhrencup was announced; Benfica played against Neuchâtel Xamax and Young Boys. On 20 July, Benfica faced Real Betis in the Algarve Football Cup. On 30 June, Benfica announced their pre-season program, which included a standalone friendly match against Hull City on 22 July.

A match between Benfica and Chapecoense was announced on 21 April, to be played on 22 July as part of the annual Eusébio Cup, but it was cancelled on 13 June due to incompatibilities with the Brazilian's team schedule, according to the Brazilian Football Confederation.

Regular season
On 8 September, the Eusébio Cup match was again announced, this time with Rangers as guests. It was scheduled to take place in Canada on 6 October, but Benfica announced its cancellation on 30 September due to the promoters' (Elite Soccer Entertainment) non-compliance with deadlines. "Unforeseen reasons and poor ticket sales" were the explanations given by the organising entity for the unexpected outcome.

Competitions

Overall record

Supertaça Cândido de Oliveira

Primeira Liga

On 5 July 2017, Liga Portuguesa de Futebol Profissional announced nine stipulations for the Primeira Liga fixture draw that took place on 7 July. Among previous conditions, two new were added, with one directly concerning Benfica: the two teams who would play the Supertaça Cândido de Oliveira could not play against Sporting CP (Portuguese team in the UEFA Champions League play-off round) on the first two matchdays.

League table

Results by round

Matches

Taça de Portugal

Third round

Forth round

Fifth round

Taça da Liga

Third round
Initially, Real was drawn into group A of the Taça da Liga; however, due to the irregular use of Abou Touré, the Disciplinary Committee of the Portuguese Football Federation awarded the team with an administrative loss in their second round match. After reformulation, Real was replaced by Portimonense.

Matches 2 and 3 were originally intended to be played on 25 October and 29 November, respectively, but were rescheduled to 20 and 29 December.

UEFA Champions League

Group stage

Statistics
Benfica used a total of 28 players during the 2017–18 season, with one being from the B squad. Three players did not make a first-team appearance in the campaign: Lopes, Branimir Kalaica and Chris Willock. Pizzi featured in 45 matches – the most of any squad member.

The team scored a total of 93 goals (including 1 own goal) in all competitions and there were 17 different goalscorers. The season's top scorer was Jonas, with 37 goals.

Nineteen players were booked during the season. Three of them were sent off: Almeida, Luisão and Živković.

Appearances and goals

(B) – Benfica B player

Hat-tricks

(H) – Home ; (A) – Away

Clean sheets

The number in parentheses represents the shared match on match 3 against Vitória de Setúbal, where Varela was the goalkeeper who was substituted on, whilst Svilar was the one on the field at the start of play.

Disciplinary record

Awards

Player

Manager

Notes
a. On 31 January 2018, Agra's season-long loan at Desportivo das Aves was terminated.
b. On 12 January 2018, César's season-long loan at Vitória de Setubal was terminated by mutual agreement.
c. Amid FPF's experiments with video assistant referee (VAR), Hélder Malheiro officiated in the first half and Nuno Almeida in the second one.

References

S.L. Benfica seasons
Benfica
Benfica